A Sense of Purpose is the ninth studio album by Swedish heavy metal band In Flames, first released in Japan on 26 March 2008. It was released on 1 April and 4 April 2008 in North America and Europe respectively. A Sense of Purpose is the final In Flames album with founding guitarist Jesper Strömblad, at this point the last original member, as he quit in February 2010. Ending the lineup that had stayed together since Colony . The album debuted at number 1 on the official Swedish album chart. On 21 May 2009, the song "Disconnected"  became an available download for the video game Guitar Hero World Tour.

Musical style
Similar to previous In Flames albums, A Sense of Purpose showcased the band's influence to combine many elements such as rich keyboard use and distinct melodies, with thrash and heavy metal sounds. A Sense of Purpose contains the band's longest recorded song to date, "The Chosen Pessimist".

In an interview, Björn Gelotte said this about the album:

Release
A Sense of Purpose was released in a limited edition box set version, of which only 1500 copies were made. This release became available on the same day as the European release. A limited edition digipak came with a making-of DVD. In the documentary, it is stated that the band recorded 17 songs and used 12 for the album, and another three for the single. This makes two previously unknown songs that have not been released yet.

Before the album's release, In Flames launched a special fansite called jesterhead.com, which featured exclusive content from the band.

The album received a Parental Advisory label, making it the only In Flames album to have explicit lyrics since Lunar Strain. The artwork for the album cover was done by Alex Pardee, who has created all the cover art for The Used and Aiden's album Conviction. A Sense of Purpose is the first studio album since Clayman to feature the band's icon, the "Jester Head", on the cover art.

The lead single, "The Mirror's Truth", was officially released on 7 March 2008 and was featured in the video game Madden NFL 09. In Flames released two other singles from A Sense of Purpose: "Alias" and "Delight and Angers".

On 10 April the album debuted at number 1 on the official Swedish album chart and at number 28 on the American Billboard 200 albums chart. In 2009 the album went gold in Sweden.

Reception

A Sense of Purpose has received generally positive reviews. Jason MacNeil of Allmusic gave the album a score of 4 stars out of 5, writing "In Flames continue to make their mark by being rooted in a strong metal or hard rock foundation but being musically and creatively inquisitive enough to seek out something more." Popmatters' Adrien Begrand wrote "If there’s one fault that can be found on A Sense of Purpose, it’s that its pace can get redundant upon first listen... plus it lacks the huge arena-appealing hooks that Come Clarity had in spades..." Begrand concluded: "However, like Reroute to Remain, the album benefits greatly from patient listening, making it a worthy addition to the catalog and continuing one of the more impressive second-decade rebirths we’ve seen from a metal band."

In a more negative review, Sputnikmusic's Adam Thomas wrote "...A Sense of Purpose shows getting rid of what was intrinsically In Flames, the harmonies. Now in their place are hackneyed synth passages and down tuned nu-metal style riffing. In an attempt to grab the attention of the fans of nu-metal's corpse, In Flames have stuck it to their old fans, again." Thomas concluded: "I'm sorry to say it, but In Flames are out of any worthwhile ideas. They even admit it in the opening track of the album, 'Without even trying' shrieks Anders on 'The Mirror's Truth'. At least he's being honest."

Track listing

DVD

Personnel

In Flames
Anders Fridén – vocals
Björn Gelotte – lead guitar
Jesper Strömblad – rhythm guitar
Peter Iwers – bass
Daniel Svensson – drums

Additional personnel
Recorded at IF Studios, Gothenburg, Sweden
Produced by In Flames, Roberto Laghi and Daniel Bergstrand
Mixed by Toby Wright
Assisted by James Musshorn at Skip Saylor Recordings, Los Angeles, California
Mastered by Stephen Marcussen at Marcussen Mastering Studios, Hollywood, California
Drum Recording – Roberto Laghi
Vocal Recording – Daniel Bergstrand and Anders Fridén
Bass Recording – Roberto Laghi
Guitar Recording – Roberto Laghi, Björn Gelotte and Jesper Strömblad
Additional drum editing – Arnold Linberg
Keys and programming – Örjan Örnkloo at Wasteland Studios
Written by Anders Fridén, Björn Gelotte, Jesper Strömblad
Arranged by In Flames
All songs published by Kobalt Music
Illustrations, art direction and design by Alex Pardee

Charts

Album

Singles

See also
 A Sense of Purpose Tour

References 

In Flames albums
2008 albums
Nuclear Blast albums
E1 Music albums